Hans Huyssing or Hans Hysing (1678–1752 or 1753) was a Swedish- born portrait painter.

Biography
Hysing was born in Stockholm, Sweden, and apprenticed to a goldsmith before studying portrait painting under David von Krafft. Hysing went to England in 1700 as assistant to fellow Swedish portrait painter Michael Dahl, with whom he lived for many years.

Hysing succeeded to Dahl's practice after the latter's death, and also adopted Dahl's manner. Hysing's patronz were the family of George II, painting the queen, the three royal princesses, and George III as a boy. Many of Hysing's portraits, including Sir Robert Walpole, the speaker Arthur Onslow, Dr. John Theophilus Desaguliers, and architect James Gibbs were engraved in mezzotint by John Faber (1695–1756), and others.

References

17th-century Swedish painters
Swedish male painters
18th-century Swedish painters
18th-century Swedish male artists
Artists from Stockholm
1678 births
Swedish emigrants to the United Kingdom
1750s deaths